Dolichoderus andinus is a species of ant in the genus Dolichoderus. Described by Kempf in 1962, the species is only endemic to Peru.

References

Dolichoderus
Hymenoptera of South America
Insects described in 1962